Daniel Balz is an American journalist at The Washington Post, where he has been a political correspondent since 1978. Balz has served as National Editor, Political Editor, White House correspondent and as the Washington Posts Texas-based Southwest correspondent. Balz sometimes appears on the news show Meet the Press and frequently appears on the PBS program Washington Week. In April 2011 the White House Correspondents' Association honored Balz with the prestigious Merriman Smith Award for excellence in presidential coverage under deadline pressure.

Early life and education 
Balz was born in Freeport, Illinois. A 1964 graduate of Freeport High School he received bachelor's and master's degrees in communications from the University of Illinois at Urbana–Champaign and served in the United States Army from 1968 to 1971.

Career

Balz is co-author, with Ronald Brownstein of the Los Angeles Times, of the 1996 book Storming the Gates: Protest Politics and the Republican Revival. In 1999, Balz received the American Political Science Association award for political coverage.

Balz's latest work, co-written with Pulitzer Prize winner Haynes Johnson in 2009, is The Battle for America 2008: The Story of an Extraordinary Election. Based on two years of reporting, it includes exclusive interviews with then-candidates Barack Obama and John McCain and many of their top advisers during the campaign and election.

After college graduation, prior to entering military service, Balz worked for the Freeport Journal Standard covering the 1968 Democratic National Convention and contemporaneous riots. Before coming to The Washington Post, he worked as a reporter and deputy editor for National Journal and as a reporter for The Philadelphia Inquirer.

Personal life
He is married to Nancy Johnson Balz and they have one son.

References

External links

 Washington Post: Dan Balz
 PBS WETA: Dan Balz
 Harvard: Fellows: Dan Balz
 Random House: Dan Balz
 American Academy of Arts & Sciences: Dan Balz

1946 births
Living people
American male journalists
American newspaper reporters and correspondents
People from Freeport, Illinois
The Philadelphia Inquirer people
University of Illinois Urbana-Champaign College of Media alumni
The Washington Post people
Journalists from Illinois
American television journalists
Freeport High School (Illinois) alumni
United States Army soldiers